Joël Jutge (born 5 April 1966 in Lavaur, Tarn) is a former French international rugby union referee. He made his international refereeing debut in a 2000 match between Italy and Romania in Naples. Jutge decided to be a referee in 1991 after his playing career was brought to an end by a knee ligament injury. He played for French club US Colomiers as a scrum-half, and later moved to Cahors before becoming a referee. He is now a referee manager. 

He controlled many notable matches, and officiated his first Six Nations Championship match in 2002, between Wales and Scotland in Cardiff and subsequently the Heineken Cup final between Leicester Tigers and Munster. He was a referee at the 2003 Rugby World Cup in Australia and was appointed as one for the 2007 Rugby World Cup in France also.

However, since the 2007 World Cup, he suffered a chronic knee injury and had to withdraw from refereeing the Calcutta Cup match in 2009. On 16 June 2009 it was announced that Jutge had retired from refereeing.

On August 3, 2012, Jutge was announced as Paddy O'Brien's successor to the position of IRB High Performance Match Official Manager. He will begin on September 3, 2012.

References

External links
Joël Jutge on rwc2003.irb.com

1966 births
Living people
Sportspeople from Lot (department)
French rugby union players
Rugby union scrum-halves
French rugby union referees
Rugby World Cup referees
European Rugby Champions Cup referees
Six Nations Championship referees
The Rugby Championship referees